Pyongyang Golf Club is a golf course in North Korea, situated on the banks of Taicheng Lake,  from central Pyongyang along the Youth Hero Highway. The golf course is the only one in North Korea. According to the authorities, 40 players use the course on a daily basis.

In 1994, Park Young-man, the course regular, told Australian journalist Eric Ellis that Kim Jong-il once scored a 34 on the course. Park continued that Kim achieved a birdie or better on every hole and had five holes-in-one. Later, this claim was further embellished to say that he had scored 11 holes in one, and that this was on the first round played at the course in 1987, and there were 17 bodyguards who witnessed it. It is not clear whether the exaggerated version was spread by the North Korean state or foreign news reporting. The website of the DPRK Amateur Golf Open credits German player Claudio Consul with the course record, with a score of 71.

In 2018, major expansion projects were initiated on the golf course, including 9 new holes, and new building and lodging facilities.

Scorecard

References

External links

Golf clubs and courses in North Korea
Sports venues in Pyongyang
Sport in Pyongyang
1987 establishments in North Korea